Street Fighter is a series of fighting video games developed and published by Japanese company Capcom. The series debuted in Japan in August 1987 with the arcade game Street Fighter, and is one of Capcom's best-selling franchises with over 33 million units sold. The games take place in a fictional universe in which a range of characters compete in fighting tournaments for prizes and bragging rights, and have been released on numerous video game consoles, handheld game consoles, personal computer platforms, and mobile devices. Related comic books, films, and other dramatizations have also been released, in addition to soundtrack albums associated with many of the main games.

Video games

Main numbered series

Sequels and remakes

Spin-offs and crossovers

Alpha series

EX series

Compilations

Other media

Films

Television series

Printed

Music albums

References

Street Fighter
Sreet Fighter
Street Fighter